Aygün Kazımova, Vol. 3 is a studio album by Azerbaijani singer-songwriter Aygun Kazimova, released on February 25, 2008, by Süper Müzik Yapım.

Track listing

References

2008 albums
Aygün Kazımova albums